Aaron Klein (born 1979) is a radio host and writer.

Aaron Klein may also refer to:

Aaron E. Klein (1930–1998), science writer
Aaron Klein, character in Where Are You Now?
Aaron J. Klein (1960–2006), Israel-based American author and journalist
Aaron Klein (born 1978), CEO at Riskalyze, former Sierra College Trustee, and co-founder of Hope Takes Root
Aaron D. Klein, Fellow at Brookings Institution, and former US Treasury Department official